Mollie King (born Mary Josephine King; April 16, 1895December 28, 1981) was an American stage and screen actress.

Early life and stage career
Mollie King was born in New York City in 1895, the daughter of Ellen Mary (née Kearney) and Thomas Joseph King, both natives of Ireland. Two of her older siblings, Charles King and Nellie King also became actors and were likely instrumental in obtaining earlier roles for her in theatre. Mollie began working professionally on stage at the age of seven. Later, by age 16, she was appearing at the Winter Garden Theatre and at other Broadway venues. A few of her stage credits include roles in Good Morning, Judge and Blue Eyes.

Film career
King signed with Pathé before moving into film acting. She was cast in leading roles in two John M. Stahl directed films, and also starred in serials. George Irving directed her in the film Her Majesty. She later returned to the stage, appearing with her brother Charles King in a musical comedy Good Morning, Judge.

Personal life and death
In 1918, King tried to enlist as an ambulance driver for the US Army in France. It took two sergeants and a first lieutenant to convince her that women are no wanted at that position.

King married Kentucky distiller Kenneth D. Alexander in 1919. The couple remained married until Kenneth's death in Arkansas in July 1935. King later married Thomas H. Claffey. 

In 1981, at age 86, King died in Fort Lauderdale, Florida. Her gravesite, however, is in her hometown of New York City, at Woodlawn Cemetery in the Bronx.

Filmography

 (1916)
A Circus Romance (1916)
 (1916)
 (1916)
The Summer Girl (1916)
 (1916)
The Mystery of the Double Cross (1917)The Seven Pearls (1917)Kick In (1917)
 Blind Man's Luck (1917)The On-the-Square Girl (1917)
  (1917)
  (1920)Suspicious Wives (1921)Her Majesty (1922)Pied Piper Malone'' (1924)

References

External links

1895 births
1981 deaths
American silent film actresses
American stage actresses
Burials at Woodlawn Cemetery (Bronx, New York)
20th-century American actresses
American musical theatre actresses